Lake Moels is a lake of Tyrol, Austria.

It can be found at the upper part of the Wattental valley at a height of 2,240 metres. The lake can be reached by following the road  beginning in Wattens. Then above the Moels Alp the lake may be gained by walking up a pretty steep trail heading for the Moels col. The mountain lake lies within a military training area, so it can be only visited at certain particular times.

Water temperature:

Water quality

The crystal-clear, clean, mountain lake water has a very high drinking water quality and is a habitat for fish such as carp and trout.

Inflow and outflow

The Mölsbach is the natural outflow and drains the lake.

References

Moels
Tux Alps